Sterculia alexandri is a species of plant in the family Malvaceae. It is endemic to South Africa, occurring in the Eastern Cape, and only found in a few localities: the Winterhoek Mountains near Uitenhage, Van Staaden's Mountains near Port Elizabeth and the Kouga Dam at the start of the Baviaanskloof. It is threatened by habitat loss.

This is a small tree growing on forest margins, stream banks, in scrub, and the slopes of valleys and ravines.

References

Flora of South Africa
alexandri
Vulnerable plants
Taxonomy articles created by Polbot